"Come On Down to My Boat" is a song written by Jerry Goldstein and Wes Farrell and performed by Every Mother's Son. Their only top 40 hit ever, it reached No. 6 on the Billboard Hot 100 in 1967, and appeared on their self-titled debut album; on the album the track was titled "Come and Take a Ride in My Boat". This same title was used by the Rare Breed who released their version the previous year, in September 1966. 

The song was produced by Wes Farrell and was ranked No. 22 on Billboard magazine's Top Hot 100 songs of 1967.

This basic song is about liberation, involving an unnamed girl who is a fisherman's daughter, who is stranded and tied up in a boat on the dock, where a young man wants to cut that rope, telling her to come on down to his boat, where they would have fun playing and sailing away from her over protective father. Metaphorically it suggests living a much more carefree overall life than she currently leads.

References

1966 songs
1966 singles
1967 debut singles
1993 singles
Songs written by Jerry Goldstein (producer)
Songs written by Wes Farrell
MGM Records singles
Songs written for films
Song recordings produced by Wes Farrell
Songs about boats